The 1965 Gent–Wevelgem was the 27th edition of the Gent–Wevelgem cycle race and was held on 21 March 1965. The race started in Ghent and finished in Wevelgem. The race was won by Noël De Pauw of the Solo–Superia team.

General classification

References

Gent–Wevelgem
1965 in road cycling
1965 in Belgian sport
March 1965 sports events in Europe